Javanese may refer to:

Of Java 
Javanese people, and their culture
Javanese language
Javanese script, traditional letters used to write Javanese language
Javanese (Unicode block),
Old Javanese,  the oldest phase of the Javanese language
Javanese beliefs
Javanese calendar
Javanese cuisine
Javanese Surinamese, an ethnic group of Javanese descent in Suriname

Other 
Javanese cat, a breed of domestic cat

See also 
Java (disambiguation)
Javan (disambiguation)

 

Language and nationality disambiguation pages